From the early 19th century through the Edwardian period, the word waist was a term common in the United States for the bodice of a dress or for a blouse or woman's shirt. A shirtwaist was originally a separate blouse constructed like a shirt; i.e., of shirting fabric with turnover collar and cuffs and a front button closure. In the later Victorian period, the term became applied more generally to unlined blouses with relatively simple construction and usually of a cotton or linen fabric, but often highly ornamented with embroidery and lace. 

From the mid-20th century, the term shirtwaist referred to a dress with the upper portion (the bodice and sleeves) fashioned like a man's shirt, with a turnover collar and buttons down the front. Different embroidery were added to the shirtwaist, like rhinestones and different patterns.  

Women who entered the workforce often wore this style of garment, and it was thus seen as a symbol of the 'New Women' that emerged in the late 19th century. They were also a staple amongst the suffragettes.

See also
Corsage (bodice)
Triangle Shirtwaist Factory Fire
New Woman

References

History of clothing (Western fashion)